Canada competed at the 1912 Summer Olympics in Stockholm, Sweden. 37 competitors, all men, took part in 30 events in 7 sports.

Medalists

Gold
 George Goulding – Athletics, men's 10 km walk
 George Hodgson – Swimming, men's 400 m freestyle
 George Hodgson – Swimming, men's 1500 m freestyle

Silver
 Duncan Gillis – Athletics, men's hammer throw
 Calvin Bricker – Athletics, men's long jump

Bronze
 Frank Lukeman – Athletics, men's pentathlon
 William Halpenny – Athletics, men's pole vault
 Everard Butler – Rowing, men's single sculls

Aquatics

Swimming

One swimmer competed for Canada at the 1912 Games. It was the second time the nation had competed in swimming, after similarly sending one swimmer to the 1908 Summer Olympics. George Hodgson won Canada's first Olympic swimming medals by taking the gold medals in both of his events, setting world records in each as well.

Ranks given for each swimmer are within the heat.

 Men

Athletics

18 athletes competed for Canada in 1912. It was the country's fourth appearance in athletics, having competed in the sport each time the nation appeared at the Olympics. For the fourth straight time, Canada won exactly one athletics gold medal, this time with George Goulding's victory in the 10 kilometre racewalk. Calvin Bricker and Duncan Gillis added silver medals in the long jump and discus throw, respectively. William Halpenny earned one of the three bronze medals in the pole vault. Frank Lukeman, originally fourth in the pentathlon, received a bronze medal in 1913 when pentathlon winner Jim Thorpe was disqualified; Lukeman retained his upgraded placing even after Thorpe's reinstatement. The 4x100 metre relay team briefly held the Olympic record in that new event, though the team was eliminated in the semifinals.

Ranks given are within that athlete's heat for running events.

Cycling

Two cyclists represented Canada. It was the second appearance of the nation in cycling, in which Canada had previously competed in 1908. Frank Brown had the best time in the time trial, the only race held, placing 5th. Because Canada had fewer than four cyclists, the nation was not entered in the team time trial event.

Road cycling

Diving

Two divers, both men, represented Canada. It was Canada's second appearance in diving. Robert Zimmerman, who had previously been Canada's lone diver in 1908, improved upon his prior performance in advancing to the final and placing 5th.

 Men

Rowing 

Ten rowers represented Canada. It was the nation's third appearance in rowing. Butler took one of the bronze medals in the single sculls, giving Canada its fourth rowing bronze medal as the nation continued to seek its first gold in the sport after having won a silver in the eights 1904. The 1912 eights crew, including one member of that silver-winning team from 1904 and three members of the bronze-medal team of 1908, was eliminated in the first round when it lost by half a length to the eventual champions.

(Ranks given are within each crew's heat.)

Shooting 

Three shooters represented Canada. It was the nation's second appearance in shooting; the 1912 team was much smaller and less successful than the 1908 squad, which had won four medals.

References

Nations at the 1912 Summer Olympics
1912
Olympics